Team FWI FC is a Barthélemois association football club that competes in the Saint-Barthelemy Championships. The club won the league championship for the first time for the 2021 season.  They won also the championship 2021-2022

References

Football clubs in Saint Barthélemy